This is the complete Chapter and Colony Roll of Psi Omega Fraternity, a professional fraternity for Dentistry. Chapters listed by order of usage by the fraternity and date of founding where known; naming was not strictly by order of the Greek alphabet due to the timing of installation ceremonies, reuse of names and local preference.

List of chapters
The chapters of Psi Omega include the following. Active chapters noted in bold, inactive chapters noted by italics.

Alumni Chapters
Alumni Chapters of Psi Omega include:

Province 1 (western)
Oregon Alumni Chapter - Portland, Oregon
Seattle-Sealth Alumni Chapter - Seattle, Washington - Organized 
Southern California Alumni Chapter - Los Angeles, California
Tacoma Alumni Chapter - Tacoma, Washington
(dormant) San Francisco Alumni Chapter - San Francisco, California

Province 2 (south)
Arkansas State Alumni Chapter - Hot Springs, Arkansas
Houston Alumni Chapter - Houston, Texas
New Orleans Alumni Chapter - New Orleans, Louisiana

Province 3 (midwest)
Chicago Alumni Chapter - Chicago, Illinois
Cleveland Alumni Chapter - Cleveland, Ohio - Organized 
Columbus Alumni Chapter - Columbus, Ohio
Detroit Alumni Chapter - Detroit, Michigan
Illinois Kappa Chapter Alumni Association - Chicago, Illinois
Indiana Alumni Chapter - Indianapolis, Indiana
Minnesota Alumni Chapter - Minneapolis, Minnesota
Milwaukee Alumni Chapter - Milwaukee, Wisconsin
Ohio State Alumni Chapter - Columbus, Ohio
(dormant) Iowa State Alumni Chapter - Iowa City, Iowa
(dormant) Portsmouth Alumni Chapter - Portsmouth, Ohio - Organized 

Province 4 (southeast)
Alabama State Alumni Chapter - Birmingham, Alabama
Georgia State Alumni Chapter - Atlanta, Georgia
North Carolina State Alumni Chapter - High Point, North Carolina
South Carolina Alumni Chapter - Charleston, South Carolina

Province 5 (northeast)
Baltimore-Oriole Alumni Chapter - Baltimore, Maryland
Duquesne-Pittsburgh Alumni Chapter - Pittsburgh, Pennsylvania
Washington D.C. Alumni Chapter - Washington, D.C.
West Virginia Stage Alumni Chapter - Wheeling, West Virginia
(dormant) Boston Alumni Chapter - Boston, Massachusetts
(dormant) Buffalo Alumni Chapter - Buffalo, New York - Organized 
(dormant) Connecticut State Alumni Chapter - 
(dormant) New York Alumni Chapter - New York City, New York
(dormant) New Jersey State Alumni Chapter - Newark, New Jersey
(dormant) Philadelphia Alumni Chapter - Philadelphia, Pennsylvania

References
All chapter locations and designations for groups founded prior to 1976 are taken from the referenced 20th ed. of Baird's Manual of American College Fraternities. Additional chapter information taken from a referenced 2013 edition of the Fraternity's Frater Magazine, a publication for actives and alumni of Psi Omega Fraternity.

External links
 Psi Omega home page

See also
List of dental schools in the United States

Dental organizations
Lists of chapters of United States student societies by society
chapters